A BiFest is a one-day festival celebrating bisexuality, usually with workshops and discussions during the day and social events in the evening, complementing the larger convention BiCon. Currently there have been at least sixteen BiFests around the UK since 1999, with the busiest attracting around 130 people.

The content of each BiFest differs, dependent on the wishes of the organisers. Features that have been consistent so far include a basic introduction to bisexuality, useful literature, people to chat to, arts/crafts and cake. Other sessions such as activism, fun and games and flirting tend to pop up fairly regularly.

Everyone is welcome, whether they are bi, bicurious, partners, friends or allies of bi people provided they are open and accepting of other attendees. Access for those with impaired mobility or with children will differ for each BiFest, so please check in advance.

Past events

Similar smaller events were held in Manchester in 2001 and 2002. However, they did not use the "BiFest" branding, and the idea was not taken up again until 2005, when a new organising team stepped forward to create an annual BiFest in London.

See also
Bisexual community

References

External links
Official website
BiFest LiveJournal community

Bisexual events
LGBT festivals in the United Kingdom
LGBT conferences
Bisexual organizations